The Greater Love is a 1927 play by the Irish writer James Bernard Fagan.

It ran for 53 performances at the Prince's Theatre in London's West End between 23 February and 9 April 1927. The original cast included Sybil Thorndike, Charles Laughton, Basil Gill, Lawrence Hanray, Lewis Casson, Colin Keith-Johnston and Brember Wills.

References

Bibliography
 Wearing, J.P. The London Stage 1920-1929: A Calendar of Productions, Performers, and Personnel. Rowman & Littlefield, 2014.

1927 plays
West End plays
British plays
Irish plays